is a Japanese stage, film, and television actor.

Biography
Kamikawa was born in Hachioji, Tokyo in 1965. He graduated from Hachioji-Kita high school in Tokyo. While studying economics in Chuo University, he acted in a minor theatrical group which was touring around Japan and performing at local schools. Kamikawa left Chuo University without a diploma, and joined the group Caramel Box to become a full-time actor.

In 1995, Kamikawa starred in a TV drama by NHK, Daichi no Ko, and played the leading role, Lu Yixin. The original author, Toyoko Yamasaki, initially wanted Masahiro Motoki to play the role. However, since the most of the drama was filmed in China and required a lot of travel, Motoki was not able to meet the tight filming schedule. Then one of the staff found Kamikawa, who was still unknown, in a magazine. Toyoko Yamasaki later commented that Kamikawa had been the right choice.

Kamikawa is nicknamed "cyborg" by his colleagues due to his extraordinary ability to memorize scripts. Although he did not understand or speak Chinese when he was offered the role of Lu Yixin, he somehow memorized all his lines in Chinese by ear for the role.

In 2006, he played Yamauchi Kazutoyo, the leading role of the NHK Taiga drama Kōmyō ga Tsuji.

In 2009, he left the group Caramel Box.

On December 4, 2009, he married a former stage actress who was 25 years old at the time.

He played the Anti-Spiral in Tengen Toppa Gurren Lagann.

Filmography

Live-action television 

  [(NHK, 1995) – Lu Yixin
 , (NHK, Renzoku Terebi Shōsetsu, 1996) – 
  (TBS, 1997) – 
 Mori Motonari (毛利元就) (NHK Taiga drama, 1997) - Mōri Takamoto (毛利隆元)
 Ao no Jidai (青の時代) (TBS, 1998) - Keiichi Haruna (榛名圭一)
 Shōnen Tachi (少年たち) (NHK, 1998), Hajime Hirokawa (広川一)
 Omizu no Hanamichi (お水の花道), (Fuji TV, 1999)
 P.S. Genki Desu Shunpei (P.S. 元気です、俊平) (TBS, 1999）
 Sinderera ha Nemuranai (シンデレラは眠らない) (Nihon TV, 2000)
 Kimi ga Oshiete Kureta Koto (君が教えてくれたこと) (TBS, 2000) - Shinichi Sayama (狭山慎一)
 Kage no Kisetsu (陰の季節)（TBS, 2000) - Shinji Futawatari (二渡真治)
 Miyamoto Musashi (宮本武蔵) (TV Tokyo, 2001) - Musashi Miyamoto (宮本武蔵)
 Shiroi Kage (白い影) (TBS, 2001) - Toshiyuki Kobashi (小橋俊之)
 Kage no Kisetsu 2 Dōki (陰の季節 2 動機)（TBS, 2001） - Shinji Futawatari (二渡真治)
 Shin Omizu no Hanamichi (Fuji TV, 2001)
 Shōnen Tachi 2 (少年たち2) (NHK, 2001)- Hirokawa Hajime  (広川一)
 Kage no Kisetsu 3 Mikkoku (陰の季節 3 密告)（TBS, 2001） - Shinji Futawatari (二渡真治)
 Shōnen Tachi 3 (少年たち3) (NHK, 2002)- Hirokawa Hajime  (広川一)
 Mama no Idenshi (ママの遺伝子) (TBS, 2002) - Wataru Fujiki (藤木渡)
 Toubou (逃亡) (NHK, 2002) - Genji (源次)
 Kindaichi Kōsuke File - Meiro Sou no Sangeki (金田一耕助ファイル・迷路荘の惨劇) (TV Tokyo, 2002) - Kindaichi Kōsuke  (金田一耕助)
 Koi wo Nannen Yasunde Masuka Special (TBS, 2002)
 Kage no Kisetsu 4 Shissou (陰の季節 4 失踪)（TBS, 2002） - Futawatari Shinji  (二渡真治)
 Kindaichi Kōsuke File - Gokumon Tou (金田一耕助ファイル・獄門島) (TV Tokyo, 2003) - Kindaichi Kōsuke  (金田一耕助)
 Chūshin Gura - Ketsudan no Toki (忠臣蔵 - 決断の時) (TV Tokyo, 2003) - Asano Takumi no Kami
 Shiroi Kyotō (白い巨塔) (Fuji TV, 2003) - Sekigucih Hitoshi (関口仁)
 Kage no Kisetsu 5 Jiko (陰の季節 5 事故)（TBS, 2003) - Shinji Futawatari (二渡真治)
 Kage no Kisetsu 6 Keiji (陰の季節 6刑事)（TBS, 2003) - Shinji Futawatari (二渡真治)
 Saigo no Chūshin Gura (最後の忠臣蔵) (NHK, 2004) - Terasaka Kichiemon (寺坂吉右衛門)
 Naga ku Kodoku na Yūkai (長く孤独な誘拐) (TBS, 2004) - Kōichi Moriwaki (森脇耕一)
 Kage no Kisetsu 7 Seisan (陰の季節 7 清算)（TBS, 2004) - Shinji Futawatari (二渡真治)
 Sokoku (祖国) (WOWOW, 2005） - Ichirō Onodera (小野寺一郎)
 Edo Makubein Satsui (エド・マクベイン 殺意) (TV Tokyo, 2005) - Hayato Kurujima (久留島隼人)
 Ame to Yume no Atoni (雨と夢のあとに) (TV Asahi, 2005) - Shirō Takashiba (高柴史郎)
 Koumyou ga Tsuji (功名が辻) (NHK Taiga drama, 2006) - Yamauchi Kazutoyo (山内一豊)
 Akechi Mitsuhide - Kami ni Aisare Nakatta Otoko (明智光秀～神に愛されなかった男) (Fuji TV, 2007) - Oda Nobunaga (織田信長)
 Edo Makubein Kaono Nai Onna (エド・マクベイン 顔のない女) (TV Tokyo, 2007) Hayato Kurujima (久留島隼人)
 Warui Yatsura (わるいやつら) (TV Asahi, 2007) - Toya Shinichi  (戸谷信一)
 Shindo 0 (震度0) (WOWOW, 2007) - Yūichi Fuyuki (冬木優一)
 Hanazakari no Kimitachi e - Ikemen Paradise (花ざかりの君たちへ イケメン♂パラダイス) (Fuji TV, 2007)- Umeda Hokuto  (梅田北斗)
 Suwan no Baka! Kozukai 3 man yen no Koi (スワンの馬鹿! こづかい3万円の恋) (Kansai TV, 2007) - Suwano Daisuke (諏訪野大輔)
 Kaikyō (海峡) (NHK, 2007) - Taketoshi Nonaka (野中武敏)
 Ryōki teki na Kanojo (猟奇的な彼女) (TBS, 2008) - Keisuke Natsume (夏目圭輔)
 Yagyū Ichizoku no Inbou (柳生一族の陰謀) (TV Asahi, 2008) - Yagyū Jūbei (柳生十兵衛)
 Rupan no Shōsoku (ルパンの消息) (WOWOW, 2008), Mizorogi Yoshito (溝呂木義人)
 Hanazakari no Kimitachi e - Ikemen Paradise Special (花ざかりの君たちへ イケメン♂パラダイス スペシャル) (Fuji TV, 2008) - Umeda Hokuto  (梅田北斗)
 Aka Hana no Sensei (赤鼻のセンセイ) (Nihon TV, 2009) - Sakurayama Makoto (桜山真)
 Ikemen Sobaya Tantei - Iindaze! (イケ麺そば屋探偵 いいんだぜ!) (Nihon TV, 2009) - Sakurayama Makoto (桜山真)
 MR. BRAIN (TBS, 2009) - Kitazato Yōhei (北里陽平)
 Kodai Shōjo Dogu Chan (MBS, 2009) - Sugihara Kenzō (杉原謙三)
 Ryōmaden (龍馬伝) (NHK Taiga drama, 2010) - Nakaoka Shintarō (中岡慎太郎)
 Gakeppuchi no Erī (崖っぷちのエリー この世でいちばん大事な「カネ」の話) (TV Asahi, 2010) - Kirino Tatsuhiko (桐野達彦)
 SPEC Keishichō Kōanbu Dai Goka Mishō Jiken Tokubetsu Taisaku Gakari Jikenbo (SPEC 警視庁公安部公安第五課 未詳事件特別対策係事件簿) (TBS, 2010) - Waki Tomohiro (脇智宏)
 Misuterī Sakka Rokuhara Ikki no Suiri Hakkotsu no Kataribe (ミステリー作家・六波羅一輝の推理 白骨の語り部) (TV Asahi, 2010) - Rokuhara Ikki (六波羅一輝)
Rokuhara Ikki no Suiri 2 Kyōto Onmyōji no Satsujin (ミステリー作家・六波羅一輝の推理2 京都 陰陽師の殺人) (TV Asahi, 2010) - Rokuhara Ikki (六波羅一輝)
 Qualtet (カルテット) (MBS, 2011) - Kuchinawa (クチナワ)
 Sakura Kara no Tegami AKB48 Sorezore no Sotsugyō Monogatari (桜からの手紙 AKB48 それぞれの卒業物語) (Nihon TV, 2011) - Maeda Kōji (前田幸次)
 CSI: Crime Scene Talks (遺留捜査) (TV Asahi, 2011) - Itomura Satoshi (糸村聡)
 Arakawa Under the Bridge ( 荒川アンダー ザ ブリッジ) (MBS, 2011) - Ichinomiya (市ノ宮積)
 BBC EARTH 2011 Human Planet (Wowow, 2011) - narrator
 NHK Special Mikaiketsu Jiken file.01 Guriko Morinaga Jiken (グリコ・森永事件) (NHK, 2011) - Katou Yuzuru (加藤譲記者)
 Pandra III Kakumei Zenya (パンドラIII 革命前夜) (WOWOW, 2011) - Kanbayashi Yōsuke (神林洋介)
 Kasya (火車) (TV Asahi, 2011) - Honma Shunsuke (本間俊介)
 Taira no Kiyomori (平清盛) (NHK Taiga drama, 2012)  - Tairano Morikuni (平盛国)
 Stepfather Step (ステップファザー・ステップ) (TBS, 2012) - the thief
 Special Drama Blackboard the 3rd Night (スペシャルドラマ ブラックボード) (TBS, 2012) - Kuroki (黒木匡)
 Shiritsu Bakarea Koukou (私立バカレア高校) (Nihon TV, 2012) - Minamoto Haruki (源春樹)
Angel Heart (Nihon TV, 2015) - Ryo Saeba
Shizumanu Taiyō (沈まぬ太陽) (Wowow, 2016) - Hajime Onchi (恩地元)
 Inspector Zenigata (銭形警部) (Nippon Television Network, 2017) - Yuichi Ozu (小津 勇一)
 BG Personal Bodyguard (TV Asahi, 2018) - Goro Murata
 MARKS no Yama (マークスの山) (WOWOW, 2019) - Gōda Yūichirō (合田雄一郎)
 No Side Manager (TBS, 2019) - Keiichiro Takigawa

Voice-over work

Anime

Films

Video games

Japanese dubbing

References

External links 
 
 
 Takaya Kamikawa at TV Drama Database 

1965 births
Living people
Japanese male television actors
Japanese male stage actors
Japanese male film actors
Japanese male voice actors
Male voice actors from Tokyo Metropolis
Voice actors from Hachiōji, Tokyo
Male actors from Tokyo
Taiga drama lead actors
20th-century Japanese male actors
21st-century Japanese male actors